Count Gustaf Bonde af Björnö (8 October 1911 – 21 September 1977) was a Swedish diplomat.

Career
Bonde was born at Trolleholm Castle, Sweden, the son of count Gustaf Trolle–Bonde (1868–1951) and countess Henriette Falkenberg (1883–1932). He became a second lieutenant in the Scanian Cavalry Regiment's (K 2) reserve in 1932 and graduated with an administrative degree (kansliexamen) in 1935. Bonde graduated from the Stockholm School of Economics in 1937 and became an attaché at the Ministry for Foreign Affairs in 1937. He served in Paris, Budapest, Washington, D.C., Cairo and Athens from 1937 to 1956. Bonde was chief of protocol at the Foreign Ministry from 1956 to 1962 and deputy introducer for foreign emissaries from 1960. He was ambassador in Santiago from 1962 to 1965, in Rio de Janeiro from 1966 to 1970, in Tehran and Kabul from 1970 to 1973 and finally in Budapest from 1973 to 1977.

Personal life
In 1935 he married countess Jacqueline Barck (1914–2009), daughter of count Nils Barck and Juliette Eberlin. He married a second time in 1961 with Elisabeth Ljunglöf (born 1922), daughter of captain Oscar Dyrssen and Maria Hallin. Bonde was the father of Carl (born 1937), Nils (born 1942) and Fredrik (born 1947).

Awards and decorations
Bonde's awards:

Herald of the Orders of His Majesty the King
King Gustaf V's Jubilee Commemorative Medal (1948)
Commander of the Order of the Polar Star
Commander First Class of the Order of the Dannebrog
Commander First Class of the Order of the White Rose of Finland
Commander First Class of the Order of the Lion of Finland
Commander with Star of the Order of St. Olav
Grand Cross of the Order of Merit
Grand Officer of the Order of Leopold II
Grand Officer of the Order of Orange-Nassau
Commander's Cross with Star of the Order of the Falcon
Grand Officer of the Order of Merit of the Italian Republic
Grand Officer of the Decoration of Honour for Services to the Republic of Austria
Grand Officer of the Order of May
Grand Officer of the Order of the Crown
Storofficer av Order of the Crown of Siam
Grand Officer of the National Order of the Cedar
Grand Officer of the Order of the Sun of Peru
Commander of the Order of Merit
Officer of the Order of the Black Star
Officer of the Order of Merit of the Republic of Hungary
Knight of the Legion of Honour

References

1911 births
1977 deaths
Swedish counts
Ambassadors of Sweden to Chile
Ambassadors of Sweden to Brazil
Ambassadors of Sweden to Iran
Ambassadors of Sweden to Afghanistan
Ambassadors of Sweden to Hungary
Stockholm School of Economics alumni
People from Svalöv Municipality
Commanders of the Order of the Polar Star
Commanders First Class of the Order of the Dannebrog
Commanders First Class of the Order of the Lion of Finland
Grand Officers of the Order of Leopold II
Grand Officers of the Order of Orange-Nassau
Grand Knights with Star of the Order of the Falcon
Grand Officers of the Order of Merit of the Italian Republic
Recipients of the Decoration for Services to the Republic of Austria
Grand Officers of the National Order of the Cedar
Recipients of the Order of the Sun of Peru
Recipients of the Order of Merit (Egypt)
Officer's Crosses of the Order of Merit of the Republic of Hungary (civil)
Chevaliers of the Légion d'honneur